is a town located in Koyu District, Miyazaki Prefecture, Japan. On October 1, 2019, the town had an estimated population of 20,185 and a density of 461 persons per km2. The total area is 43.80 km2.

Geography

Neighbouring municipalities 

 Miyazaki Prefecture
 Saito
 Kijō
 Kawaminami
 Shintomi

Transportation

Railway 

 JR Kyushu - Nippō Main Line
 Takanabe

Highways 

 Higashikyushu Expressway
 Japan National Route 10

Notable people from Takanabe
Sky Brown, professional skateboarder
Miki Imai, pop singer and actress
Kaneshiro Kofuku, sumo wrestler

References

External links

Takanabe official website 
Takanabe English Tourist Information

Towns in Miyazaki Prefecture